Ascott d'Oyley is a village in Oxfordshire, England.  The name ‘Ascott’ is derived from the Old English ēast (east) and cot (cottage), whilst d’Oyley was appended because Wido de Oileo ‘held the place in the late eleventh century.’  Ascott d’Oyley with its sister village Ascott Earl together form the larger community of Ascott-under-Wychwood.  Ascott d’Oyley is recorded in the 1086 Domesday Book as having 14 households and a mill, under the lordship of Roger d'Oilly, and tenanted by Robert d’Oilly, whose family gives the village its name.  An earthmound marks the remains of Ascott d’Oyley Castle.  Today the village consists of stone-built houses and cottages grouped around the High Street and Mill Lane.  Ascott d'Oyley is served by Windrush Valley School and Ascott-under-Wychwood railway station.

See also
Ascot d'Oilly Castle

References

External links 
 
 

Villages in Oxfordshire
West Oxfordshire District